The 1950 Cork Intermediate Hurling Championship was the 41st staging of the Cork Intermediate Hurling Championship since its establishment by the Cork County Board in 1909.

Carrigtwohill won the championship following a 6-04 to 1-01 defeat of Shanballymore in the final. This was their third championship title overall and their second title in succession.

References

Cork Intermediate Hurling Championship
Cork Intermediate Hurling Championship